Coal Ridge and Coalridge may refer to:

Coalridge, West Virginia, an unincorporated community in Kanawha County
Coal Ridge High School, in Garfield County, Colorado
Coal Ridge Baptist Church and Cemetery, in Knoxville, Iowa